The Senate Court Apartments are a historic apartment building located in Portland, Oregon, United States. It is an important work in the career of Portland architect Roscoe Hemenway, who generally focused on single-family residential designs. In it, Hemenway employed the Colonial Revival style to draw out an air of respectability and tradition, in an effort to make apartment living more appealing to a middle-class clientele. Built in 1944 for developer Douglas W. Lowell, the complex was aimed at single women working in war industries. Lowell went on to develop over 3,000 housing units in Portland through his career.

The building was entered on the National Register of Historic Places in 1997.

See also
National Register of Historic Places listings in Northeast Portland, Oregon

References

External links

Oregon Historic Sites Database entry

1944 establishments in Oregon
Apartment buildings on the National Register of Historic Places in Portland, Oregon
Colonial Revival architecture in Oregon
Kerns, Portland, Oregon
Northeast Portland, Oregon
Portland Historic Landmarks
Residential buildings completed in 1944